The men's 100 metre backstroke was a swimming event held as part of the swimming at the 1924 Summer Olympics programme. It was the fourth appearance of the event, which was established in 1908. The competition was held on Wednesday July 16, 1924, on Thursday July 17, 1924, and on Friday July 18, 1924.

Records
These were the standing world and Olympic records (in minutes) prior to the 1924 Summer Olympics.

In the first heat Warren Kealoha set a new Olympic record with 1:13.4 minutes. In the final he bettered his own record to 1:13.2 minutes.

Results

Heats

Wednesday July 16, 1924: The fastest two in each heat and the fastest third-placed from across the heats advanced.

Heat 1

Heat 2

Heat 3

Heat 4

Heat 5

Semifinals

Thursday July 17, 1924: The fastest two in each semi-final and the faster of the two third-placed swimmer advanced to the final.

Semifinal 1

Semifinal 2

Final

Friday July 18, 1924:

References

External links
Olympic Report
 

Swimming at the 1924 Summer Olympics
Men's events at the 1924 Summer Olympics